Maria Svarbova (born in 1988) is a Slovak fine-art photographer. Svarbova's most recognized collection is In the Swimming Pool.

Biography 
Svarbova was born in 1988 in Zlaté Moravce, Slovakia and she currently lives in Bratislava, Slovakia. She attended Constantine the Philosopher University in Nitra and the School of Applied Arts Josefa Vydru in Bratislava. Svarbova's artworks have appeared in magazines such as Vogue, Forbes, CNN and The Guardian. She has been commissioned to photograph advertising campaigns for large international companies such as Apple, Murata and Museum of Ice Cream. Svarbova has been featured in numerous solo exhibitions in galleries and museums around the world.

Style 
Maria Svarbova works depict socialist-era architecture, public spaces and routine actions of daily life. The Guardian has described her work as "inspired by the stark architecture" of Slovakia. She prefers brutalist architecture and functionalism. She experiments with colours, space and symmetry of composition. CNN has described her typical post-production process as "the bodies are multiplied, colors are enhanced and asymmetrical elements are erased." Juxtapoz Magazine declares that characters in Svarbova's photographies "have chosen to give up any kind of extravagance that might unmask them". Each scene is meticulously designed, especially with regard to the colors of the props and the minimalist poses of the models; the photographer relies on a lighting and costume team to do this.

Books 

 Maria Svarbova: Futuro Retro. New Heroes and Pioneers, 2019. 
Maria Svarbova: Swimming Pools. New Heroes and Pioneers, 2021.

Exhibitions 
Selected solo and group exhibitions.
어제의 미래 (Futuro Retro), Seoul Arts Center - Hangaram Art Museum, Seoul, South Korea, 2022-2023, Solo museum exhibition
 Fragile Concrete, Kolektiv Cité Radieuse, Marseille, France, 2021, Solo exhibition at Unité d’Habitation Le Corbusier
20th Century Art: A Different Perspective, London, United Kingdom, 2021, Sotheby's auction
212 Photography Istanbul, Istanbul, Turkey, 2020, International Photography Festival
 Gilman Contemporary, Ketchum, Idaho, United States, 2020, Solo gallery exhibition
Lotte Gallery Jamsil, South Korea, 2019, Solo gallery exhibition
Contessa Gallery, Worth Avenue, Palm Beach, Florida, US, 2019, Solo gallery exhibition
Minnesota Marine Art Museum, Minnesota, US, 2019, Solo museum exhibition
ART Miami, Contessa Gallery, Miami, Florida, US, 2019, Art Fair
Asia Premiere Expo, Art Angle Gallery, Taipei, Taiwan, 2018, Solo exhibition of whole work
Weather, Daelim Museum, Seoul, South Korea, 2018, Group museum exhibition
Delpozo, Madrid and London, Spain and United Kingdom, 2017, Solo exhibition
Leica Gallery, Miami, US, 2017, Solo gallery exhibition
Vogue Italia, Milan, Italy, 2016, International Photography Festival

References 

Slovak photographers
Slovak women photographers
1988 births
Living people